Black Dawn (also known as Foreigner 2: Black Dawn) is a 2005 American action film directed by Alexander Gruszynski in his feature film directorial debut. It was produced by, and stars, Steven Seagal, who reprises his role as Jonathan Cold. It is a follow-up to the 2003 film The Foreigner.

Plot
Jonathan Cold is a former-CIA agent now working for himself and offering his services to the highest bidder. Jon is hired to break James Donovan out of prison. After a successful break, Jon takes James to see his brother, arms dealer Michael Donovan, who had hired Jon to break James out. In gratitude, the Donovans hire Jon to help sell parts for a small nuclear bomb to Nicholi, Nicholas Davidoff, the leader of a Chechen terrorist group planning to blow up Los Angeles because the CIA killed the group's previous leader. Meanwhile, Jon's former protégé, agent Amanda Stuart, is spying on the Donovans for the CIA. The Donovans see her spying on them while dealing with Nicholi. Jon rescues Amanda and takes Michael hostage. Nicholi does not care what happens to Michael, so that does not work as well as it should. Jon and Amanda go on the run, trying to keep the Donovans out of the way and stop Nicholi from blowing up LA.

Cast

References

External links

2005 films
2005 direct-to-video films
2005 action films
American action films
Direct-to-video action films
Direct-to-video sequel films
Films about terrorism
Films shot in Los Angeles
Sony Pictures direct-to-video films
2005 directorial debut films
2000s English-language films
2000s American films